Ernocornutia chiribogana is a species of moth of the family Tortricidae. It is found in Pichincha Province, Ecuador.

The wingspan is 21 mm. The ground colour of the forewings is pale brownish, strigulated (finely streaked) with brown. The hindwings are pale ochreous cream with grey strigulation.

References

Moths described in 2008
Euliini
Moths of South America
Taxa named by Józef Razowski